Lill Maria Kotka (called Mimmi Kotka; born 12 July 1981) is a Swedish athlete who specialized in ultrarunning.

Running career
In a 2016 interview, Kotka talked about her running background: "I have always loved outdoor life and kept active with skiing, biking, hiking, diving, yoga but not running. But in 2010, I signed up to run Lidingöloppet as a challenge and got obsessed with trail running while practicing for it. That was my thing! Then I took it easy in 2012, 2013, and in January 2014, I decided to go all in. Train more focused. It was a little too focused in 2015. I ran a lot and got injured. In 2016, I took it easier, and now I seem to have found a formula that works. It is more fun than ever to run, and my body thrives."

Kotka's major claim to fame is winning the 101 km Ultra-Trail Courmayeur-Champex-Chamonix (CCC) in Chamonix, France, in 2016 by a margin of almost half an hour and the 121 km Ultra-Trail Sur les Traces des Ducs de Savoie (TDS) in the same location, and in 2017, by almost two hours and a half, improving the previous course record from 2015 by 46 minutes.

For some years, Kotka suffered from RED-S relative energy deficiency in sport (RED-S), getting back to normal form at the beginning of 2021.

Personal life
Kotka is of Finnish descent through her father. who is from Finland.
Since 2017, she and her husband, Toni Spasenoski, who is a high-tech project manager and amateur photographer, live mostly in Chamonix.

For a living, Kotka works as a nutritionist. In 2018, she started Moonvalley, an online shop dedicated to organic energy bars and sports drinks, together with fellow athletes Ida Nilsson and Emelie Forsberg.

Results

2010
 126th Lidingöloppet , Sweden

2011
 2nd Lidingö Ultra , Sweden
 13th Swiss Alpine Marathon , Switzerland
 23rd Lidingöloppet , Sweden

2012
 2nd Trail des Balcons d'Azur , France
 5th AXA Fjällmaraton , Sweden

2014
 2nd Kullamannen Ultra , Sweden
 3rd AXA Fjällmaraton , Sweden 
 2nd Ultravasan , Sweden
 1st Coastal Trail Series – Dorset Ultra 44 miles, UK

2015
 8th IAU Trail WC Annecy , France 

2016
 1st Trail des Balcons d'Azur , France
 1st Trail du Lac d'Annecy – Marathon Race , France
 1st Gran Trail Courmayeur , Italy (2nd overall)
 1st Ultra-Trail Courmayeur-Champex-Chamonix (CCC) , France
 23rd Limone Extreme Skyrace , Italy

2017
 1st Run Stockholm , Sweden
 1st Marathon du Mont Blanc , Italy
 3rd High Trail Vanoise , France
 1st Swiss Alpine Marathon , Switzerland
 1st Ultra-Trail Sur les Traces des Ducs de Savoie (TDS) , France (new course record)
 5th Grand Trail des Templiers , France
 1st Kullamannen Dubbel-Döden (English: Double Death) , Sweden

2018
 1st Madeira Island Ultra-Trail , Portugal
 1st MaXi-Race International – Annecy , France (3rd overall)
 1st Samoëns Trail Tour - Tour du Giffre , France
 1st Marathon du Mont Blanc , France (second straight victory on a course that was 9k longer than the previous year)
 6th, Grand Raid de la Réunion (aka La diagonale des fous) , Réunion, France
 3rd, Ultra-Trail Cape Town , South Africa

2019
 1st, UTM Marão , Portugal
 13th, Madeira Island Ultra-Trail , Portugal
 1st, La 6000D , France (5th overall)
 20th, Ultra-Trail du Mont-Blanc (UTMB) , France/Italy/Switzerland
 2nd, Ultra Pirineu , Spain

2021
 1st, Quartrail des Alpages , Italy
 3rd, Lavaredo Ultra Trail , Italy
 1st, La 6000D , France (second straight victory)
 3rd, Ultra-Trail du Mont-Blanc (UTMB) , France/Italy/Switzerland

2022
 1st, Lavaredo Ultra Trail , Italy
 2nd, Ultra-Trail Cape Town , South Africa

References

External links

Mimmi Kotka's profile at Kikourou

1981 births
Living people
Swedish ultramarathon runners
Swedish mountain runners
Swedish female long-distance runners
Female ultramarathon runners
Swedish sky runners
Swedish people of Finnish descent